The Roman military standards included the emblems adopted by several units of the Roman army through its history.

Among these there were:
 Aquila, the emblem of the Roman legion after the Marian reforms;
 Vexillum, the emblem of a legion, cohors, numerus or detachments of such units;
 Draco, a cavalry standard later adopted also by infantry units;
 Labarum, personal ensign of emperor Constantine I, later adopted as army standard.